Cosmaresta eugramma is a species of moth of the family Oecophoridae. It is known from the Australian Capital Territory, New South Wales and Victoria.

References

External links
CSIRO Ecosystem Sciences - Australian Moths Online

Oecophorinae